Bowring and Lady Curzon hospitals (BLCH) is a teaching hospital and autonomous university in Bangalore, Karnataka, India. It was originally a medical institution belonging to Mysore State, but in 1884 it was made over to the Civil and Military Administration. This hospital was only the Civil Medical Institution of Bangalore till 1890. It had accommodation for 104 beds, of which 80 were for men and 24 for women patients. Additional accommodation for female patients was provided by the donations contributed by philanthropic citizens and by the Government of India.Now it's renamed as Sri Atal Bihari Vajpayee Medical College and Research Institute inaugurated on 29/12/2020

Located in Shivajinagar in the city's central business district, the 152-year-old hospital has also been teaching students pursuing medical degrees since late 19th century during the British Raj.

History
The Bowring & Lady Curzon Hospitals was built on the plan of the Lariboisière Hospital in Paris and was formally opened in 1868 by Mr. Lewin Benthon Bowring, the then Commissioner of Mysore. It was originally a medical institution belonging to Mysore State, but in 1884 it was made over to the Civil and Military Administration. This hospital was only  the Civil Medical Institution of Bangalore till 1890. It had accommodation for 104 beds, of which 80 were for men and 24 for women patients. Additional accommodation for female patients was provided by the donations contributed by philanthropic citizens and by the Government of India. This additional hospital was named Lady Curzon Hospital. The two hospitals were fully equipped with X - ray and Pathological laboratory. They were both placed in the combined charge of one Superintendent in 1911. In 1947, the Civil and Military station were retroceded to the Mysore Durbar. As a consequence of this, the Bowring & Lady Curzon Hospitals along with other medical institutions of the area were placed under the administrative control of the Mysore Medical Department.

Research activity :
The institute played active role during COVID-19 pandemic not only by providing healthcare services but also enriching medical science through its research work.

Vintage Gallery

References

External links
 Bowring & Lady Curzon Hospitals

Hospital buildings completed in 1868
Government buildings completed in 1868
Teaching hospitals in India
Hospitals in Bangalore
1868 establishments in India
Hospitals established in 1868